Alan-a-Dale (1899–1925) is an American Thoroughbred racehorse best known for winning the 1902 Kentucky Derby. He was named for a figure in the Robin Hood legend. According to the stories, he was a wandering minstrel who became a member of Robin's band of outlaws, the "Merry Men." He was bred by Thomas McDowell at his Ashland Stud in Lexington, Kentucky. He was the son of the 1895 Kentucky Derby winner Halma. Raced and trained by McDowell, at age two Alan-a-Dale won three of his four starts but the following year health problems kept him out of racing until Kentucky Derby time. Ridden by future Hall of Fame jockey Jimmy Winkfield, the official Kentucky Derby website says that Alan-a-Dale had a lead of six lengths and despite going lame down the stretch, "carried on with flawless courage to win by a nose." This injury kept Alan-a-Dale out of racing for the rest of the year.

At age four, Alan-a-Dale returned to the track and raced successfully for three more years, retiring with seventeen wins from his thirty-seven lifetime starts. At stud, he met with limited success and died in 1925 at age twenty-six.

Pedigree

References
 Alan-a-Dale's pedigree and partial racing stats

1899 racehorse births
1925 racehorse deaths
Racehorses bred in Kentucky
Racehorses trained in the United States
Kentucky Derby winners
Thoroughbred family A16
Byerley Turk sire line